The sit-in movement, sit-in campaign or student sit-in movement, were a wave of sit-ins that followed the Greensboro sit-ins on February 1, 1960 in North Carolina.  The sit-in movement employed the tactic of nonviolent direct action and was a pivotal event during the Civil Rights Movement.

African-American college students attending historically Black colleges and universities in the United States powered the sit-in movement across the country. Many students across the country followed by example, as sit-ins provided a powerful tool for students to use to attract attention. The students of Baltimore made use of this in 1960 where many used the efforts to desegregate department store restaurants, which proved to be successful lasting about three weeks. This was one small role Baltimore played in the civil rights movement of the 1960s. The city facilitated social movements across the country as it saw bus and taxi companies hiring African-Americans in 1951–1952.

Students at Baltimore, Maryland's, Morgan State College had successfully deployed sit-ins and other direct action protest tactics against lunch counters in that city since at least 1953. The local chapter of the Congress of Racial Equality had had similar success. Witnessing the unprecedented visibility afforded in the white-oriented mainstream media to the 1960 sit-ins in Greensboro, North Carolina, Morgan students (and others, including those from the Johns Hopkins University) continued sit-in campaigns already underway at department store restaurants near their campus. There were massive amounts of support from the community for the students’ efforts, but more importantly, white involvement and support grew in favor of desegregation of department store restaurants.

List of sit-ins

Precursors to sit-in movement

Beginning with Greensboro sit-ins

Related post-1960 sit-ins

See also
 The Children, 1999 book on the Nashville Student Movement
 Women's War

Notes

References

Further reading

Books

Journals

External links
 
 
 

Civil disobedience
Civil rights movement
Civil rights protests in the United States
History of African-American civil rights
Lunch counters